Tiddische is a municipality in the district of Gifhorn, in Lower Saxony, Germany. The Municipality Tiddische includes the villages Hoitlingen and Tiddische.

References

Gifhorn (district)